Giorgio Avola (born 8 May 1989) is an Italian right-handed foil fencer. 

Avola is a three-time team European champion, 2011 individual European champion, and four-time team world champion.

A three-time Olympian, Avola is a 2012 team Olympic champion. 

Avola competed in the 2012 London Olympic Games, the 2016 Rio de Janeiro Olympic Games, and the 2020 Tokyo Olympic Games.

Medal record

Olympic Games

World Championship

European Championship

Grand Prix

World Cup

References

External links
 
 

Italian male fencers
Italian foil fencers
1989 births
Living people
Olympic fencers of Italy
Fencers at the 2012 Summer Olympics
Fencers at the 2016 Summer Olympics
Olympic gold medalists for Italy
Olympic medalists in fencing
Medalists at the 2012 Summer Olympics
People from Modica
Mediterranean Games gold medalists for Italy
Mediterranean Games medalists in fencing
Competitors at the 2013 Mediterranean Games
Fencers of Fiamme Gialle
Sportspeople from the Province of Ragusa
Fencers at the 2020 Summer Olympics